Bush Middle School may refer to: 
 Barbara Bush Middle School in Irving, Texas (Dallas-Fort Worth) - Carrollton-Farmers Branch Independent School District
 Bush Middle School in San Antonio, Texas - North East Independent School District
 G. W. Bush Middle School in Tumwater, Washington - Tumwater School District